The Army and Navy is a Grade II listed public house at 1–3 Matthias Road, Stoke Newington, Hackney, London N16 8NT.

It was built in 1936 and was Grade II listed in 2015 by Historic England.

References

Pubs in the London Borough of Hackney
Grade II listed pubs in London
Stoke Newington
Grade II listed buildings in the London Borough of Hackney